Events in the year 1561 in Norway.

Incumbents
Monarch: Frederick II

Events

Arts and literature

Births
Christoffer Hjort, priest, expelled from the country for Catholicism in 1613 (died 1616).

Deaths

See also

References